Ack van Rooyen (1 January 1930, The Hague – 18 November 2021) was a Dutch jazz trumpeter and flugelhornist. He was the brother of Jerry van Rooyen.

Van Rooyen began playing with a military band as a teenager, touring bases in Indonesia. He then studied music at the Royal Conservatory of The Hague, graduating in 1950, then worked with Ernst van 't Hoff and his brother. He played with The Ramblers in 1955–1957, then moved to France in 1957, where he worked with Aime Barelli, Kenny Clarke, Lucky Thompson, and Barney Wilen. In 1960, he relocated to Germany, playing in a big band at Sender Freies Berlin with his brother, in addition to side work with Hans Koller, Bert Kaempfert, and Åke Persson. He settled in Stuttgart in 1967 and worked with musicians such as Volker Kriegel, Charly Antolini, Friedrich Gulda, Slide Hampton, and Eberhard Weber. He also toured widely during this time.

In 1980, he returned to the Netherlands, eventually taking a position as an educator at his alma mater, the Royal Conservatory.

He died on 18 November 2021, at the age of 91.

References

External links
 
 

1930 births
2021 deaths
Dutch jazz trumpeters
Jazz flugelhornists
Musicians from The Hague
Royal Conservatory of The Hague alumni
Academic staff of the Royal Conservatory of The Hague
21st-century trumpeters
Kenny Clarke/Francy Boland Big Band members
The Ramblers (band) members
RCA Victor artists
MPS Records artists